Bite Yer Legs is a media production company established in London, England in 2001 by Keith Bunker and Isobel Williams. They produce TV and radio programmes and DVDs, including shows for the BBC, ITV, Discovery Channel, British Sky Broadcasting and the History Channel, as well as Radio Five and online broadcasts. Their DVD productions include the Davina McCall Fitness series which is produced for 2entertain. The company has produced content for a number of commercial brands including Adidas, Pepsi, Coca-Cola, BetFred, Ladbrokes,  Marmite and Eidos.

Staff 
Bite Yer Legs is headed by founders Keith Bunker and Isobel Williams. They previously worked with each other as senior editors for the BBC. Caspar Norman is the head of production and joined the company in 2007. Head of radio is Mark Sharman and the executive producer is Rosie Seed.

Productions

TV 
 The Troubles I've Seen
 SAS: The Originals
 Eamonn Investigates: Alien Autopsy
 Britain Behaving Badly
 Midlands Sports Awards
 My Big Fat Greek Olympic Dream
 Late Tackle
 Local Heroes
 Alex James: Life on Mars
 Little Dreams
 Ways of Hearing

365 TV 

 Mark Owens' Celebrity Scooters
 Mike Tyson in the UK
 Mike Vs Tyson

Radio programs 

 Gabby Logan
 Eamonn Holmes
 The Radio 1 Punk Show
 Big in Bombay Big in Beijing
 Dom and Danny Do Xmas
 For One Night Illegally
 The Banned
 The Gethin Jones Show
 My 5 Live
 The Dirtiest Race in History
 Hull, One Year On
 Eamonn Holmes at Christmas
 Gabby Logan and Katie Derham's Christmas Revue
 Happy New Year with Russell Fuller
 The Umpire Strikes Back
 Eamonn Holmes' Christmas Quiz,
 Happy New Year with Phil Williams
 A Year in Premiership Square
 When Gaffer Says No
 Kirsty Gallacher
 Kirsty Gallacher and Phil Williams
 The Greatest
 Great White Hopes
 The Real Muhammad Ali
 The Falls of Mike Tyson
 An Extraordinary Library
 Five Go To Africa

DVDs

 Davina's Super Body Workout
 Ryan Giggs - True Red
 Davina's High Energy Five Workouts
 Keep Fit, Look Fit with Danielle Lloyd
 Yummy Baby
 Davina Pre/Post-Natal Fitness DVD
 Jade's Shape Challenge
 Spell...
 Strike It Lucky
 Alien Autopsy - The True Story
 Davina 3×30 Workouts
 Davina McCall's Power of 3 Workouts

Television production companies of the United Kingdom
Video production companies
Radio production companies
Companies based in London
2001 establishments in England
Television production companies
Companies established in 2001